The gymnastics competition at the 1995 Pan American Games was held from March 11 to March 26 in Mar del Plata, Argentina.

Medal summary

Medal table

Artistic gymnastics

Men's events

Women's events

Rhythmic gymnastics

Individual

Group

See also
 Pan American Gymnastics Championships
 South American Gymnastics Championships
 Gymnastics at the 1996 Summer Olympics

References

Events at the 1995 Pan American Games
P
1995